Steel Magnolias is an American comedy-drama television film directed by Kenny Leon that premiered at Lifetime Network on October 7, 2012. It is a contemporary retelling of the play Steel Magnolias and its 1989 film adaptation. The new film stars an all-black American cast, including Queen Latifah as M'Lynn, Jill Scott as Truvy, Condola Rashād as Shelby, Adepero Oduye as Annelle, with Phylicia Rashād as Clairee and Alfre Woodard as Ouiser.

Cast
Queen Latifah as Mary Lynn "M'Lynn" Eatenton
Jill Scott as Truvy Jones
Alfre Woodard as Louisa "Ouiser" Boudreaux
Adepero Oduye as Annelle Dupuy-DeSoto
Phylicia Rashād as Clairee Belcher
Condola Rashād as Shelby Eatenton-Latcherie
Lance Gross as Sammy DeSoto
Michael Beasley as Spud Jones
Tory Kittles as Jackson Latcherie
Afemo Omilami as Drum Eatenton
Demetrius Bridges as Jonathan Eatenton
Justin Martin as Tommy Eatenton
Jeff Rose as Dr. Judd

Reception

Critical reception
The film has been met with positive reviews from critics, with a score of 74 out of 100 from Metacritic. Many critics praised Alfre Woodard's performance as Ouiser.

Ratings
The film premiered on Sunday, October 7, 2012, on Lifetime and earned 6.5 million viewers. It is the 3rd highest viewed Lifetime Original.

Awards
Alfre Woodard was nominated for numerous awards for her performance as Ouiser, including the Screen Actors Guild Award for Outstanding Performance by a Female Actor in a Miniseries or Television Movie and Primetime Emmy Award for Outstanding Supporting Actress in a Miniseries or a Movie.

References

External links
 Official Page
 

2012 television films
2012 films
African-American films
Lifetime (TV network) films
2010s female buddy films
Remakes of American films
American films based on plays
Films set in Louisiana
Films scored by William Ross
Television remakes of films
2012 comedy-drama films
Films about mother–daughter relationships
Films directed by Kenny Leon